Vallikannan,  is the pseudonym of R. S. Krishnasamy (12 November 1920 – 9 November 2006), a Tamil writer, journalist, critic, and translator from Tamil Nadu, India.

Biography
Krishnasamy was born in Rajavallipuram near Tirunelveli. He started writing at a very young age and had published twenty five books by the time he was 30. He worked for magazines like Cinema Ulagam, Navasakthi, Grama Oozhiyan and Hanuman. He also wrote under the pseudonyms "Naiyandi Bharathi" and "Koranathan". He wrote a total of 75 books in his life - novels, novellas, poetry collections, plays and essay anthologies.

In 1978, he was awarded the Sahitya Akademi Award for Tamil for his critical work on modern Tamil poetry Pudukavithaiyin Thottramum Valarchiyum  (lit. The birth and growth of Modern Tamil Poetry). He died in 2006.

Books
Bharathidasanin uvamai nayam (1946)
Pudhukavidhayin Thorramum Valarchiyum (1977)
Saraswathi Kalam(1986)
Bharathikkuppin Tamil Urai Nadai (1981)
Thamizhil Siru Pathirikkaigal (1991)
Madam rides the bus

References

1920 births
2006 deaths
20th-century Indian journalists
Recipients of the Sahitya Akademi Award in Tamil
Tamil writers
Poets from Tamil Nadu
People from Tirunelveli district
Indian Tamil people
20th-century Indian poets
Journalists from Tamil Nadu